Emma Raducanu defeated Leylah Fernandez in the final, 6–4, 6–3 to win the women's singles tennis title at the 2021 US Open. She became the first qualifier to win a major. Additionally, she became the first British woman to win a singles major since Virginia Wade at the 1977 Wimbledon Championships, and the second player to win the US Open on her debut after Bianca Andreescu in 2019. Aged 18, she became the youngest major champion since Maria Sharapova at the 2004 Wimbledon Championships and with a ranking of world No. 150, the lowest-ranked player to win a major since Kim Clijsters at the 2009 US Open. Raducanu won the title without losing a set during the tournament, including during her three qualification matches, and did not play a tiebreak in any set. This was her maiden WTA Tour singles title, making her the fourth woman in the Open Era to win a major as her maiden singles title.

Naomi Osaka was the defending champion, but was defeated by Fernandez in the third round.

The final marked the first all-teenage major final since Serena Williams defeated Martina Hingis at the 1999 US Open, and the first women's singles major final in the Open Era to feature two unseeded players. Raducanu and Fernandez both made their top 30 debuts following the tournament. Fernandez was the youngest player to defeat three top-five seeded players in the same major since Williams at the 1999 US Open.

This was the first major since the 2011 French Open and first US Open since 2003 where neither of the Williams sisters participated. This event also marked the final major appearance for former world No. 6 Carla Suárez Navarro, who lost in the first round to Danielle Collins.

None of the top 20 seeds lost prior to the third round, the first time this occurred since the introduction of the 32-seed format in 2001. The defeats of Karolína Plíšková and Barbora Krejčíková in the quarterfinals guaranteed two first-time major finalists; Raducanu and Fernandez emerged to become those players. This also ensured that, for the first time since 2014, eight different players contested the four major finals in a season.

Seeds

Draw

Finals

Top half

Section 1

Section 2

Section 3

Section 4

Bottom half

Section 5

Section 6

Section 7

Section 8

Championship match statistics

Seeded players
The following are the seeded players. Seedings are based on WTA rankings as of August 23, 2021. Rank and points before are as of August 30, 2021.

As a result of pandemic-related adjustments to the ranking system, players are defending the greater of their points from the 2019 and 2020 tournaments. In addition, points from tournaments held during the weeks of September 9, 2019 and September 7, 2020 will be dropped at the end of the tournament and replaced by the player's next best result.

† The player did not qualify for the tournament in 2019 or 2020. Accordingly, points for her 16th best result are deducted instead.

Withdrawn players 
The following players would have been seeded, but withdrew before the tournament began.

Other entry information

Wild card entries

Qualifiers

Lucky losers

Protected ranking

Withdrawals

 – not included on entry list& – withdrew from entry list

See also 
2021 US Open – Day-by-day summaries

Explanatory notes

References

Women's Singles
2021